John Edwards (1820 -  25 November 1872) was a member of the Queensland Legislative Assembly.

Biography
Edwards was born in England in 1820. He arrived in Australia around 1844 and became the lessee of Ban Ban Station in the Burnett region with his brother. He drowned aboard the Royal Adelaide when it sank at Portland in England.

Public career
Edwards won the seat of Burnett in the Queensland Legislative Assembly at the 1863 Queensland colonial election. He held Burnett for two years before resigning in April 1865.

References

Members of the Queensland Legislative Assembly
1820 births
1872 deaths
19th-century Australian politicians